John Poulett, 3rd Baron Poulett (c. 1641 – June 1679), was an English peer.

Poulett was the son of John Poulett, 2nd Baron Poulett, by Catharine Vere, daughter of Horace Vere, 1st Baron Vere of Tilbury. He sat as a Knight of the Shire for Somerset between 1662 and 1665, when he entered the House of Lords on the death of his father. In 1674 he was appointed Lord Lieutenant of Dorset, which he remained until his death.

Lord Poulett married, firstly in 1663, Essex Popham, eldest daughter of Alexander Popham of Littlecote, Wiltshire by whom he had two daughters. He married, secondly 1667, Lady Susan Herbert, daughter of Philip Herbert, 5th Earl of Pembroke. He died in June 1679 and was succeeded in the barony by the son of his second marriage, John, who was created Earl Poulett in 1706.

References

1640s births
1679 deaths
3
Lord-Lieutenants of Dorset
Poulett, John
Year of birth uncertain
Burials at the Poulett mausoleum, Church of St George (Hinton St George)
John, 3rd Baron